Vladimir Vasilyevich Galouzine (Vladimir Galuzin) is a Russian tenor. He has performed in such Russian operas as The Queen of Spades,  Boris Godunov and Khovanshchina and has performed the lead tenor roles in Italian operas including Madama Butterfly, Otello, Tosca, Aida, and Manon Lescaut.

Career
Galouzine was born in Rubtsovsk, Soviet Union, a town near Novosibirsk. In 1981, after graduating from the Novosibirsk Conservatory, he joined the Novosibirsk Opera.

From 1990 to 2012 he worked regularly with the Mariinsky Opera under Valery Gergiev. His first leading role with the company was the title role in Verdi’s Otello in 1991. In 1993, he debuted as Hermann in Tchaikovsky's The Queen of Spades, a role which he has reprised several times in both Russian and French, and of which he is considered the world's leading exponent. He has also performed the title roles in Verdi’s Don Carlo and Rimsky-Korsakov’s Sadko, Radames in Verdi's Aïda, Calaf in Puccini’s Turandot, Des Grieux in Puccini's Manon Lescaut, Cavaradossi in Puccini's Tosca, Alexey in Prokofiev’s The Gambler, Sergey in Shostakovich’s Lady Macbeth of Mtsensk, Khovansky in Mussorgsky's Khovanschina, Canio in Leoncavallo’s I Pagliacci.

He has performed at most of the world's leading theaters, concert halls and festivals, including the Metropolitan Opera, San Francisco Opera, Houston Grand Opera, Los Angeles Opera, and the Lyric Opera of Chicago in the United States; London's Royal Opera House, Covent Garden, in the United Kingdom; Milan's Teatro alla Scala; Venice's La Fenice, the Teatro Verdi in Trieste, the Teatro Comunale di Bologna as well as Florence's Teatro Comunale; the Vienna State Opera in Austria; the Opéra National (Bastille) and Théâtre de Chatelet, both in Paris, as well as Toulouse’s Théâtre de Capitole and the Marseille Opera in France; Madrid’s Teatro Real and Barcelona’s Grand Teatre del Liceu in Spain; both the Mariinsky Theater in Saint Petersburg and the Bolshoi Theater in Moscow, Russia; Amsterdam’s De Nederlandse Opera in the Netherlands; the Deutsche Oper Berlin, the Cologne Opera and the Festspielhaus Baden-Baden in Germany; the New National Theater in Tokyo, Japan; the Israeli Opera; and the Teatro Colón in Buenos Aires, Argentina. In addition, he has performed at the Salzburg Festival, Bregenz and Edinburgh Festivals and Washington’s Kennedy Center; London's Royal Albert Hall; the Chorégies d'Orange and the Arena di Verona.

He has worked with such renowned conductors as Valery Gergiev, Claudio Abbado, Riccardo Muti, Zubin Mehta, Seiji Ozawa, Michel Plasson, Gennady Rozhdestvensky, Mstislav Rostropovich and Michail Jurowski amongst many others.

In 2007, Galouzine was appointed a People's Artist of Russia. In 2008, he received an honorary doctorate from the National University of Music Bucharest.

Personal life
Vladimir married soprano Nataliya Tymchenko 9 June 2009.

External links
 Official website down actually
 Interview with Vladimir Galouzine, October 23, 2000

References

1956 births
Living people
People from Rubtsovsk
People's Artists of Russia
Russian operatic tenors
Novosibirsk Conservatory alumni